Lead the Best "Michishirube" (導標 (みちしるべ) / Guidepost) is the second compilation album by Japanese hip hop group Lead, released on July 31, 2022. The album debuted at No. 6 on Oricon.

The collection includes their most recent singles "Tuxedo" and "Sonic Boom", along with a new song recorded for the album titled "Michishirube".

Between April 29 and June 9, whichever songs were the most popular between twelve streaming platforms, including Spotify, Apple Music, Amazon Music, Rakuten Music and KKBOX, were included on the fourth CD.

Information
Lead the Best "Michishirube" was released on July 31, 2022, and is the group's first compilation album since Lead Tracks: Listener's Choice, which was released in 2008. 

The album debuted at No. 6 on the Oricon Albums Charts before reaching a peak of No. 5 on the second day. The album took No. 34 on the weekly charts with a first week sales of 2,482. 

The album was released in three editions: 3CD, 4CD+DVD and 4CD+DVD+Photobook. The first three discs house every single the group has released since their debut with "Manatsu no Magic" (2002) until their most recent single "Sonic Boom" (2021). The fourth disc contains a selection of the most popular songs that were streamed on various platforms between April 29 and June 9. The DVD contains a selection of live performances from various tours the group had performed throughout the years. The photobook edition was available through pre-orders on Pony Canyon's online shop between the months of April and June.

Promotional activities
Prior to the album's release, Lead released two singles, "Tuxedo" and "Sonic Boom".

"Tuxedo" was the thirty-third single released Lead on September 23, 2020, and first post their ninth studio album Singularity. It debuted at No. 5 on Oricon. It was released as a standard CD, in two CD+DVD editions, and in a CD+booklet edition. Both CD+DVD editions include "Tuxedo" and coupling track "Kangoku Rokku", while the CD+Booklet contains "Tuxedo" and "Wild Fight". The Type A DVD includes the music video and making video of the title track. The Type B DVD carried their Lead Special Winter Live, which was performed on February 18, 2020 at Harevutai in Tokyo. The song "Kangoku Rokku" was a cover of Elvis Presley's 1957 song "Jailhouse Rock". It became the first time Lead had released a song completely performed in English since their debut in 2002. Its corresponding music video was later released on the streaming platform YouTube.

"Sonic Boom" was their thirty-fourth single released on August 25, 2021, and was their only single released in 2021. It debuted at No. 10 on Oricon. The DVD contained excerpts from their Lead Special Winter Live, which was performed on February 18, 2020 at Harevutai in Tokyo.

The song "Michishirube" from Lead the Best was used as the ending theme for the television show Machicomi beginning September 1.

Commemorative performance
On the album's day of release, Lead held their first public lives since 2019 due to COVID-19. They held two daytime performances and two nighttime performances at Tachikawa Stage Garden in Tachikawa, Tokyo. The songs performed at the venue were those chosen by fans, with the exception of the first song, "Manatsu no Magic". 
Hiroki Nakadoi, the group's previous leader who graduated in 2013, made an appearance during one of the evening shows.

Track listing

Special release events
Special Album "Lead the Best" Launch Events

 September 3, 2022: Asunal Kanayama Aichi (Free Live/Autograph Session)
 September 4, 2022: Abeno Q's Mall Osaka (Free Live/Autograph Session)
 September 10, 2022: isME! Oheso Hiroba Miyagi (Free Live/Autograph Session)
 September 11, 2022: Queens Square Yokohama 1F Queen's Circle Kanagawa (Free Live/Autograph Session}
 October 8, 2022: Canal City Hakata Fukuoka (Free Live/Autograph Session)

Charts

References

Lead (band) albums
Pony Canyon compilation albums
2022 albums
2022 compilation albums